Elizabeth Anne McCauley is an art historian. She serves as David Hunter McAlpin Professor of the History of Photography and Modern Art at Princeton University.

McCauley graduated from Yale University.
Her work deals with 19th- and early-20th-century visual culture, particularly the history of photography.

Works
 A. A. E. Disdéri and the Carte de Visite Portrait Photograph (Yale University Press, 1985) 
 Industrial Madness: Commercial Photography in Paris, 1848-1871 (Yale University Press, 1994) , 
 The Museum and the Photograph with Mark Haworth-Booth (Sterling and Francine Clark Art Institute, 1998) , 
 Gondola Days: Isabella Stewart Gardner and the Palazzo Barbaro Circle with Alan Chong, Rosella Mamella Zorzi, and Richard Lingner (Isabella Stewart Gardner Museum, 2004) , 
 The Steerage and Alfred Stieglitz with Jason Francisco (University of California Press, 2012)

References

Living people
Historians of photography
Women art historians
Princeton University faculty
Yale University alumni
Year of birth missing (living people)
American art historians